Abai is an opera in two acts, created by Latif Khamidi and Akhmet Zhubanov, on a libretto of Mukhtar Auezov, inspired by a slice of the life of the poet Abai Qunanbaiuli (1845–1904).

Created on December 24, 1944, at the Kazakh Abai Opera and Ballet Theater during the year preceding the centenary of Qunanbaiuli's birth, it is considered one of "the most beautiful operas written in Kazakh language".

History 
For the premiere, the distribution, upon direction of Jandarbekov, included Rishat Abdulin (as Abai), Kulyash Baisseitova (as Ajar) and Anuarbek Umbetbayev (as Aidar).

The opera has been performed in Moscow in 1958, in Berlin and Dresden in 1986 and in Paris at the Théâtre des Champs-Élysées on October 26, 2014.

The opera is part of the repertoire of the Astana opera and Kazakh Abai Opera and Ballet Theater.

Scenario 
Abai helps Aidar, one of his disciples, and his fiancé, Ajar, to overcome the obstacles to their wedding, but a rival poisons the young man.

Act I 
 First scene
While fleeing by night, Aidar and Ajar are caught by the members of the clan of Narymbet, spouse of Ajar by arranged marriage. Aidar invokes the name of Abai as his protector, but it only increases the anger of their chasers, who decide to tie him to a horse and to drag him. Abai comes and intervene in favor of the young couple, swearing to protect them. The question should be brought before the Aqsaqal.
Jirenshe, an influential man, partisan of the clan of Narymbeta, asks Azim, another disciple of Abai, to convince Ajar to return in her village, and to deliver up Aidar. Azim declines. Nevertheless, Azim is jealous of the poetic talent of Aidar and of the preference Abai shows towards him.
The aqsaqal visits Abai, and asks to hear Ajar. The latter explains that only love drove her to abandon her spouse, infringe the tradition and join Aidar.

 Second scene
Judgement scene upon presidency of Syrttan. Jirenshe requires the death of Aidar and the return of Ajar in her village. Azim defends Aidar, but his argumentation turns contradicted; then, Abai pleads the cause of the young couple, and wins the case. Jirenshe and the members of the clan of Narymbet swear to make Aidar perish.

Act II 
 Third scene
Celebration of Ajar and Aidar's wedding. Azim pours poison in Aidar's cup. Aidar begins a song in honour of his beloved spouse, and collapses before the end of his song.

Fourth scene
Aidar dies. Jirenshe is first suspected of the poisoning, then Azim is declared guilty of the murder. Azim is punished, but the people is in mourning.
The opera ends with Abai leading his people and encouraging him to move forward.

Music 
The music is inspired by traditional folkloric Kazakh songs and melodies, which granted to the opera a wide success, above all due to the arias of Abai (: "I come to greet you, Kalamkas..."); and : "birch"). The aria : "What is the point?"), in which Abai hopefully sings of the future of the people, has become an emblematic musical theme.

Literature 
 Abai on the national encyclopedy Almaty, 2004 (Russian).

References 

Kazakhstani music
1944 operas
Kazakh-language operas